The 1957 Davidson Wildcats football team represented Davidson College as a member of the Southern Conference (SoCon) during the 1957 NCAA University Division football season. Led by sixth-year head coach Bill Dole, the Wildcats compiled an overall record of 5–3 with a mark of 1–3 in conference play, tying for seventh in the SoCon.

Schedule

References

Davidson
Davidson Wildcats football seasons
Davidson Wildcats football